New York Congregational Home for the Aged, also known as New York Congregational Center for Community Life, was a historic care facility associated with the Congregational church at 123 Linden Boulevard in Flatbush, Brooklyn, New York, New York. It was a three-story brick institutional building in the Colonial Revival style. It was built in three stages; the center section and east pavilion in 1918, west pavilion in 1921, and west wing in 1927. It was listed on the National Register of Historic Places in 2008. 

In 2017, the main building was demolished and is now the site of PLG Luxury Apartments.

References

Residential buildings on the National Register of Historic Places in New York City
Colonial Revival architecture in New York City
Buildings and structures completed in 1927
Residential buildings in Brooklyn
National Register of Historic Places in Brooklyn